Eduard "Edi" Franz Krieger (16 December 1946 – 20 December 2019) was an international Austrian footballer.

Club career
Krieger started his professional career at Austria Wien before moving abroad in 1975 to enjoy a very successful period at Ernst Happel's FC Brugge. With Brugge he won three league titles and a domestic cup title. In 1976 they reached the UEFA Cup Final against Liverpool, which they lost 4-3 on aggregate. In 1978, he again was on the losing side against Liverpool in the 1978 European Cup Final.

After a short spell at Dutch side VVV-Venlo, Krieger returned to Austria to finish his career at LASK Linz.

International career
He made his debut for Austria in April 1970 against Yugoslavia and was a participant at the 1978 FIFA World Cup. He earned 25 caps, no goals scored. He played his final international match in 1978.

Honours

Player 

 Austria Wien

 Austrian Football Bundesliga: 1969-70
 Austrian Cup: 1970-71, 1973-74

 Club Brugge

 Belgian First Division: 1975–76, 1976–77, 1977–78
 Belgian Cup: 1976–77
 UEFA Cup: 1975-76 (runners-up)
 European Champion Clubs' Cup: 1977-78 (runners-up)
 Jules Pappaert Cup (1): 1978

References

External links
 Profile - Weltfussball 
 Profile - Club Brugge
 Profile - Austria Archive
 

1946 births
2019 deaths
Footballers from Vienna
Austrian footballers
Austria international footballers
1978 FIFA World Cup players
FK Austria Wien players
Club Brugge KV players
VVV-Venlo players
LASK players
Austrian Football Bundesliga players
Belgian Pro League players
Eredivisie players
Expatriate footballers in Belgium
Expatriate footballers in the Netherlands
Association football midfielders
Association football defenders
Austrian expatriate sportspeople in the Netherlands
Austrian expatriate sportspeople in Belgium
Austrian expatriate footballers